Byrnedale is an unincorporated community and census-designated place in Elk County, Pennsylvania. As of the 2010 census, the population was 427.

It is located in Jay Township, in the valley of Kersey Run, and is bordered to the south by Weedville. Pennsylvania Route 255 passes through Byrnedale, leading north  to St. Marys and southwest  to DuBois.

Demographics

References

External links
Byrnedale PA – Start-up website for the city of Byrnedale PA

Census-designated places in Pennsylvania
Census-designated places in Elk County, Pennsylvania